Scott Williams (born July 21, 1962) is a former professional American football fullback and tight end who played in the National Football League (NFL). He played college football at Georgia.

Early life and high school
Williams was born and grew up in Charlotte, North Carolina and attended North Mecklenburg High School, where he played both basketball and football. Williams accepted a scholarship to play college football at Georgia over an offer to play both basketball and football at the North Carolina.

College career
Williams redshirted as a freshman during Georgia's National Championship season in 1980 as he moved from halfback to wide receiver and then eventually to the tight end position. Williams also played on Georgia basketball's junior varsity team. He played tight end as a redshirt freshman before being moved to fullback as a redshirt sophomore. Williams was moved back to tight end before his redshirt senior season and led the Bulldogs with 19 receptions and 204 receiving yards with one touchdown reception and scored a second touchdown as a rusher.

Professional career
Williams was selected by the St. Louis Cardinals in the ninth round of the 1985 NFL Draft, but was released during the preseason. Williams was signed by the Detroit Lions before the 1986 season. He spent three years with the team, playing in 32 games and scoring four total touchdowns. His career was cut short due to a shoulder injury that he suffered against the Denver Broncos in 1988.

References

1962 births
American football fullbacks
Georgia Bulldogs football players
Detroit Lions players
Players of American football from Charlotte, North Carolina
Living people
St. Louis Cardinals (football) players
American football tight ends